Priyutnensky District (Priyutnin rayon) is an administrative and municipal district (raion), one of the thirteen in the Republic of Kalmykia, Russia. It is located in the west of the republic. Its administrative center is the rural locality (a selo) of Priyutnoye. As of the 2010 Census, the total population of the district was 11,658, with the population of Priyutnoye accounting for 51.6% of that number.

History
The district was established in 1938.

Administrative and municipal status
Within the framework of administrative divisions, Priyutnensky District is one of the thirteen in the Republic of Kalmykia. The district is divided into eight rural administrations which comprise twenty-two rural localities. As a municipal division, the district is incorporated as Priyutnensky Municipal District. Its eight rural administrations are incorporated as eight rural settlements within the municipal district. The selo of Priyutnoye serves as the administrative center of both the administrative and municipal district.

References

Notes

Sources

Districts of Kalmykia
 
States and territories established in 1938
